There are two communities called Saint-Prosper in Quebec:
Saint-Prosper, Chaudière-Appalaches, Quebec
Saint-Prosper-de-Champlain, Quebec (formerly Saint-Prosper)